Zhao Rui (born January 14, 1996) is a Chinese basketball player for the Chinese national team and the Guangdong Southern Tigers. He was included in the Chinese squad for the 2019 FIBA Basketball World Cup.

Later, Zhao was included in China's squad for the 2023 FIBA Basketball World Cup qualification.

References 

1996 births
Living people
Chinese men's basketball players
Point guards
Asian Games gold medalists for China
Basketball players at the 2018 Asian Games
Asian Games medalists in basketball
2019 FIBA Basketball World Cup players
Medalists at the 2018 Asian Games